Alvina is an English female given name with the meaning "elf friend", "amicable", "friendly". In English it is the feminine form of Alvin, which comes from the Old English name Ælfwine, containing the words ælf meaning "elf" and wine meaning "friend", or from the Old High German name Adelwin / Adalwin, meaning Noble Friend.

It is an uncommon name, first attested in mediaeval English records, and was revived in the 20th century. Popularity waned after 1939, and now less than 0.001% of the British population is named Alvina. Diminutives of this name include Alveena, Alvi, Alvy and Alwy.

Notable people with this name

Please add notable people who appear in this list: .

 Anicée Alvina was a French Actress
 Alvina Kong, Chinese Actress
 Alvina Krause was the founding director of the Bloomsburg Theatre Ensemble

Fictional characters
 Alvina Houghton, a character in The Lost Girl by D. H. Lawrence

Variations
 Elvina
 Elvyna
 Elwina
 Elwyna

Male
 Elvis
 Elwin
 Elwyn
 Alvin
 Alwyn
 Elvin

Female
 Alveena
 Elvina (disambiguation)
 Elvena
 Vena

References

External links
 Behind the Name

English feminine given names